Mool Chand Meena is an Indian politician and former Member of Parliament (1992-2006.)

Meena was born on 14 February 1956,  at Jeewali Village[Gangapur city]in the Sawai Madhopur district of Rajasthan.  He is married with one son and two daughters.  He received his M.A. and L.LB from Rajasthan University.  Meena worked in many administrative positions for local political and community groups through the 1970s and 80s, working for such causes as the implementation of NSUI cells in Rajasthani Universities and various Youth Congress Committees around Rajasthan.  He was soon elected to the Ministry of State Legislative assembly in Rajasthan, working amongst various committees and in subsequently higher positions up to the Vice-President of the Pradesh Congress Committee, working there until 2003.  In 1992, he was elected to the Upper Parliament of India (Rajya Sabha) though 2006, becoming the deputy Chief Whip in 2003.  In 1998, he took the position of Secretary of the All India Congress Committee, of which he is currently employed.

References

Meena people
Rajya Sabha members from Rajasthan
Indian National Congress politicians
Living people
Rajasthani politicians
1956 births
People from Sawai Madhopur district
Indian National Congress politicians from Rajasthan